Adre (English: Home) is a Welsh language television programme, presented by Nia Parry and broadcast on S4C since August 2017.

Premise
In each programme Parry is invited into the home of a well-known Welsh personality, discovering what it tells us about the person's character, background and career. Parry then interviews the personality about their life and history. During production the crew spend two days filming at each house.

Transmissions

Episodes

Series 1 (2017−18)

Series 2 (2018)

Christmas Special (2018) 

A Christmas special, Adre Nadolig, was broadcast on 24 December 2018 and visited a number of celebrities to see how they celebrated the festive season.

Series 3 (2019)

Series 4 (2019−20)

Christmas Special (2019) 

A Christmas special, Adre Nadolig, was broadcast on 23 December 2019 and visited three people decorating their extravagant houses for the festive period.

Series 5 (2020)

References

2017 British television series debuts
S4C original programming